Abyssobela atoxica is a species of sea snail, a marine gastropod mollusk in the family Raphitomidae.

Distribution
This is a deep-sea species, occurring in the Izu–Ogasawara Trench, Japan.

References

 Kantor YuI, Sysoev AV. 1986. A new genus and new species from the family Turridae (Gastropoda, Toxoglossa) in the northern part of the Pacific Ocean. Zoologichesky Zhurnal 65:485-498

External links
 

atoxica
Gastropods described in 1986